Dąbki may refer to the following places:
Dąbki, Greater Poland Voivodeship (west-central Poland)
Dąbki, Masovian Voivodeship (east-central Poland)
Dąbki, Bytów County in Pomeranian Voivodeship (north Poland)
Dąbki, Lubusz Voivodeship (west Poland)
Dąbki, Chojnice County in Pomeranian Voivodeship (north Poland)
Dąbki, Człuchów County in Pomeranian Voivodeship (north Poland)
Dąbki, West Pomeranian Voivodeship (north-west Poland)